Tofoitaufa Sandra Salevasaosamoa King-Young is an American Samoan politician. She is currently the American Samoa Medicaid Director. She is a member of the American Samoa Democratic Party.

Tofoitaufa was born in American Samoa and educated at Loyola Marymount University, George Washington University and the Stanford Graduate School of Business. In 1999 she was appointed Deputy Director of the Office of Insular Affairs.

She participated in the 2012 American Samoa gubernatorial election as running mate for Save Liuato Tuitele, but was eliminated in the first round.

In August 2013 she resigned as chair of the LBJ Tropical Medical Center in order to take up the position of Medicaid director.

In May 2019 she was forced to suspend critical health services due to lack of funding. In November 2019 the off-island referral program to treat American Samoans overseas was suspended. In August 2020 she suggested a sales tax or legalisation of medicinal marijuana be used to fund medicaid in American Samoa.

References 

Loyola Marymount University alumni
George Washington University alumni

Year of birth missing (living people)
Living people